The Berlin March Battles of 1919, also known as Bloody Week, were the final decisive phase of the German Revolution of 1918–1919. The events were the result of a general strike by the Berlin working class to enforce the widely anticipated socialization of key industries, as well as the legal safeguarding of the workers' and soldiers' councils and thus the democratization of the military. The strike action was met with violence from the paramilitary Freikorps, resulting in street fighting and house-to-house fighting around the Alexanderplatz and the city of Lichtenberg.

On 3 March, workers from AEG Hennigsdorf drafted a resolution for a general strike in order to enforce the so-called "Hamburg Points" for democratizing the military that had been approved by the Reichsrat Congress in Berlin in December 1918. The strike was supported by the Communist Party of Germany and the Independent Social Democratic Party of Germany. The German government, under the leadership of the Majority Social Democratic Party of Germany, responded with the imposition of a siege on Berlin and Spandau by the military on the orders of Defence Minister Gustav Noske. The Volksmarinedivision, which had previously taken a neutral role during the Spartacist Uprising, distributed weapons to the strikers and fought government troops after a member was fatally wounded. The general strike was ended on 8 March by the orders of the strike leadership led by Richard Müller. There were some concessions made by the Weimar government following negotiations with the workers' councils. However, the clashes only ended on 16 March with the lifting of the shooting order by Noske.

The fighting ended, according to Noske, with more than 1,200 dead, 75 of them on the government side. Estimates from Richard Müller suggest as much as 2,000 deaths, with other estimates being as high as 3,000. There was no official count conducted by government authorities. Much of this bloodshed can be attributed to orders from Freikorps commander Waldemar Pabst that permitted the summary execution of all individuals caught with a firearm, which resulted in the killing of many civilians and war veterans who were uninvolved in the strike. Among those killed was Communist Party leader Leo Jogiches, the former personal partner of murdered revolutionary Rosa Luxemburg. The March Battles represent one of the bloodiest but largely forgotten conflicts within the revolutionary struggles in Germany after the First World War.

Background 
The cause of the March Battles was rooted in the demands of the increasingly radicalized German working class. Among the popular demands was the socialization of key industries, introduction of the council system and the democratization of the military. These demands had first emerged in the November Revolution, which itself had been carried out by the working class. On 18 December 1918, the Reichsrat Congress confirmed the demands concerning the military in the Hamburg Points. Its key demands were that the Council of the People's Deputies was to hold the power of command over all army and navy units, all rank insignia were to be abolished, and soldiers' councils were to elect their own leaders and be responsible for discipline. The January 1919 elections saw the left-wing political camp fall short of a majority, and the Majority Social Democratic Party formed a moderate coalition government known as the Weimar Coalition that encompassed itself, the liberal German Democratic Party and the conservative German Centre Party. This government proved unwilling to enforce the Hamburg Points, and the military high command actively worked against democratization and reform.

The months following the election saw great labour unrest across the country, with the Spartacist Uprising and a general strike in Upper Silesia in January, a general strike in the Ruhr in February and yet another general strike in Central Germany around Halle, Merseburg, Leipzig and Erfurt from February to early March. Simultaneous were attempts to enforce council rule on a local level in Bremen, Brunswick and Munich. Also notable was the presence of the "Republican Soldiers' Army" in Berlin, composed of the remnants of the Volksmarinedivision as well as other revolutionary-minded soldiers. The publicist Sebastian Haffner described this period as a "civil war" in Germany: "In reality, there was only one thing at stake: the existence of the workers' and soldiers' councils and thus the legitimacy of the revolution."

General strike in Berlin 
The workers' councils in Berlin had, since mid-February, sought to reorganize the Reichsrat Congress in order to enforce the demands of the November Revolution. The soldiers' councils sought similar goals, seeing the dominance of the Freikorps and former imperial officers over the military as a threat to democratization and reform. The Central Council, solely controlled by the MSPD and in charge of the reorganization of a new Reichsrat Congress, hesitated in addressing the demands.

In the general assembly of the Berlin Workers' Council from 26–28 February, a resolution that called for the institution of the Hamburg Points and condemned the Weimar National Assembly was passed with a wide majority that included MSPD-aligned members. The outcome of the resolution as well as information about the general mood of the factory workers was telegraphed to the government in Weimar. Although supportive of the demands, the USPD and KPD were cautious about engaging in street protests due to previous experiences with the Freikorps. Instead they believed the workers should focus on organizing in their workplaces: "Do not let yourselves be drawn into fresh gun-fights! Noske is waiting just for that to provoke fresh bloodshed!"

On February 28 delegates from AEG Hennigsdorf requested a vote on a resolution for a general strike. However, the vote would be postponed until the next meeting on 3 March. Before the conclusion of the meeting, an election was held to the Central Council in which the Independent Social Democrats won 7 seats, followed by 7 for the Majority Social Democrats, 2 for the Communists and 1 for non-left "Democrats". This gave the Independents and Communists a majority. In the next meeting on 3 March, delegates from many large industries reported that the strike had already begun, which prompted nearly all MSPD-aligned members to support the general strike resolution in spite of the Berlin MSPD's warning against a strike in a Vorwärts article just the previous day. The final vote was decisively in favor of the call for a general strike. Several strike goals were outlined:

 Recognition of the workers' and soldiers' councils
 Complete implementation of the Hamburg Points
 Release of all political prisoners
 Lifting of the state of siege
 Arrest of all those involved in political murders
 Organization of the workers' guard
 Dissolution of the Freikorps
 Resumption of political and economic relations with the Soviet Republic

On the same day, the Prussian state government declared a state of siege over Berlin. Gustav Noske, the Defence Minister, was subsequently provided with extensive civil and military powers. Public demonstrations were banned by his decree along with the distribution of newspapers. Force was authorized against those infringing on the decree. From 3–4 March, violent encounters occurred between police and striking workers. The industry, commerce and transport of Berlin had largely ceased to function by 4 March. Looting of shops by strikers was reported, which was denounced by the revolutionaries. However, Noske used these incidents as a pretext to send the Freikorps into Berlin. On the same day, the Communists withdrew from the strike committee in opposition to the participation of the MSPD. In particular there was a conflict over the printing of newspapers. The printers did not initially join the strike, which allowed the MSPD newspaper, Vorwärts, to be published. The Berlin Workers' Council agreed that no newspapers should be published, but the Communists insisted that only the KPD newspaper Die Rote Fahne and USPD newspaper Die Freiheit should be published.

On 6 March, the fourth day of the strike, USPD delegates proposed that water, gas and electricity workers should join the strike amidst the increasingly violent situation in Berlin. The MSPD delegates opposed the extension, but were outvoted. This prompted their withdrawal from the Berlin Workers' Council and the strike committee, and the MSPD soon appealed for the strike to be called off. The MSPD's control of the Berlin Trade Union Commission proved decisive, as they too called for the strike to end. The printers were the first to return to work. Attempts to negotiate a conditional end to the strike under terms drafted on 7 March proved fruitless. This prompted the resignation of Richard Müller from the strike committee, which was followed up with the unconditional cancellation of the general strike on 8 March.

Deployment of the Freikorps 
Violence between government forces and striking workers began almost immediately after the approval of the general strike resolution on 3 March. The publishing office for Die Rote Fahne was raided and destroyed by government forces that same day. In the afternoon and evening, many workers gathered in the Scheunenviertel and Alexanderplatz, and clashes began with police. This was followed with the looting of shops and the storming of police stations for weaponry. These actions were denounced by the strike leadership as being staged by "provocateurs". Even the MSPD newspaper, Vorwärts, stressed that such actions were not those of the strikers.

On 4 March government troops invaded the city. On the side of the counterrevolutionaries was five formations: the Freikorps Reinhard, Freikorps Lützow, Freikorps Hülsen, Guards Cavalry Rifle Division and German Protection Division. Walther von Lüttwitz was in command of all Freikorps in Berlin and the surrounding area, while Wilhelm Reinhard commanded the Freikorps Reinhard and Waldemar Pabst, known as a perpetrator of the murders of Rosa Luxemburg and Karl Liebknecht, commanded the Guards Cavalry Rifle Division. In Spandau, revolutionary soldiers guarding a weapons depot were fired on and eventually disarmed. The news of the incident inflamed the anger of the strikers. A unit of Freikorps tried to drive through a crowd, and the commanding officer was intercepted by the strikers. Freikorps forces soon intervened with armored cars and tanks and fired on the crowd, resulting in a massacre. In an attempt to calm the situation, Richard Müller publicly disassociated the strike effort from those engaging in "trouble-making". The Communists warned in a leaflet against engaging in putschism.

The situation grew more volatile on 5 March after Freikorps forces attacked a detachment from the Volksmarinedivision that had attempted to negotiate the occupation of the police headquarters. As the delegation left the negotiations, a sailor, Rudolf Klöppel, was fatally shot in the back. The incident shifted the opinion of the sailors, who distributed weapons to strikers and began to actively fight the Freikorps. Barricades were erected in the Alexanderplatz and the most brutal fighting of the strike commenced. The Freikorps attacked with planes, tanks, armored cars, artillery, mortars and machine guns. The Communists denounced the Volksmarinedivision under the context of their previous neutrality during the Spartacist Uprising.

The fighting continued over the following days in the areas north and east of the Alexanderplatz. The insurgents were primarily from the Republican Soldiers' Army, including the remnants of the Volksmarinedivision, who were aided by armed civilians and members of the KPD-aligned "Red Army Confederation". The conduct of the fighting, especially the indiscriminate usage of artillery by the Freikorps in heavily-populated residential areas, contributed greatly to the large death toll.

The "Lichtenberg police murder" and other hoaxes 
On 8 March, the Lichtenberg Post Office, occupied by Freikorps, was conquered by insurgents. The insurgents then stormed the police headquarters, which was also taken after heavy fighting. 20 police officers were taken prisoner but then released that night, while the rest including the police chief were able to escape. The escaped officers gave inaccurate reports of supposed atrocities to government troops and the media, alleging that the insurgents ordered all officers to be executed. The story spread rapidly throughout bourgeois newspapers, and eventually spread to Vorwärts as well. Press reports gave figures from 60 to 200 officers killed. In reality, only 2 officers were killed during the fighting. Other hoaxes reported by the media included that of "Spartacist-minded" airmen dropping bombs on civilians, as well as supposed "Spartacist piles" of civilian bodies.

It was not until 13 March that the press would begin to correct the stories."All these messages were lost. It was not until 13 March that the BZ reported that the officers had actually been released. On the same day, 'Vossische' and 'Vorwärts', based on the statements of Mayor Ziethen, declared 'that all the news about the mass shootings of guards and detectives in the conquest of the Lichtenberg police headquarters have proved untrue'. Finally, after the BZ issue of 14 March and the obituary of the fallen, it turned out that only two police officers were dead. One of them fell in battle and nothing could be ascertained about the death of the other."

The actions of the military 

On 9 March, using the misreported atrocities as justification, Gustav Noske decreed:"The brutality and bestiality of the Spartacists who fight against us compel me to give the following order: any person who is caught with arms in his hands in the struggle against the government will be shot on the spot."The military took the order further, ordering the shooting of anyone caught with weapons in their homes. Firearms searches commenced at random resulting in numerous summary executions, including against those uninvolved in the strike. The Freikorps indiscriminately attacked residential buildings under the claim that they had been shot at, leaving entire areas in complete ruin from artillery and aerial bombs. Residents fled to their cellars but supported the insurgents by providing food and drink. On 11 March, 29 sailors of the Volksmarinedivision were murdered with machine guns when they went to surrender and collect their discharge pay. The sailors were picked out of several hundred prisoners because they "looked intelligent". Colonel Reinhard had ordered the shooting allegedly because the prisons were overcrowded.

The conservative mayor of Lichtenberg, Oskar Ziethen, sought a truce between Noske and the insurgents to avoid further bloodshed. These advances were rejected, as Noske insisted on "unconditional surrender or nothing". The last barricade fell on 12 March. By 13 March the fighting had almost completely ended, although the shooting order would not be lifted until 16 March.

Estimates of death tolls range from 1,200 to 3,000, with small losses for government forces. Among those killed was KPD leader Leo Jogiches on 10 March, who was shot while allegedly trying to escape from the police. Alongside the deaths were thousands of arrests, with about 4,500 prisoners being crowded into the Moabit and Plötzensee prisons. Conditions were inhumane and prisoners were often mistreated or had their injuries neglected, leading to additional deaths.

Results 
The military, dominated by former imperial officers, had long planned to disempower the population and revolutionary soldiers. The March Battles would see the dissolution of the Volksmarinedivision and the weakening of the Republican militias. On 6 March the Freikorps was legally integrated into the provisional Reichswehr, a move that would be important later in the Kapp–Lüttwitz Putsch.

The Lichtenberg city council established a commission to determine the cost of the damage, which presented its analysis in April 1919. They estimated a loss of 1.5 million Reichsmark in the public sector and 450,000 Reichsmark in the private sector.

The collaboration of the MSPD with the Freikorps did not go unnoticed, with the events contributing to their loss of influence both locally and nationally. Lichtenberg would become a stronghold for the USPD and KPD, and relations between the Communists and the Social Democrats were left permanently in tatters. The June 1920 elections would see a collapse in votes for the MSPD, with the USPD emerging in second place.

The historian Ralf Hoffrogge sees the general strike and the March Battles as a turning point in the history of the November Revolution and emphasizes its supraregional significance:"Unlike the January Uprising, the March strikes were a supra-regional movement and therefore far more dangerous for the government. In the Ruhr area, central Germany and Berlin, mass strikes called for the recognition of workers councils and the immediate socialization of key industries. The National Assembly in Weimar was virtually surrounded by the general strike and unable to act. [...] But the strikes were not coordinated temporally and spatially. While they were gaining momentum in one region, they were already crumbling elsewhere. Although they forced the government to make verbal concessions, they later could be individually beaten down."

See also 

 German Revolution of 1918–19
 Skirmish of the Berlin Schloss
 Spartacist Uprising
 Bavarian Soviet Republic
 Bremen Soviet Republic
 March Action
 Ruhr Uprising
 Hamburg Uprising

Further reading 

 Alfred Döblin: Der deutsche Maskenball von Linke Poot. Wissen und Verändern!. (Walter, Olten und Freiburg, 1972)
 Emil Julius Gumbel: Vier Jahre politischer Mord. (Berlin, 1922)
 Dietmar Lange: Massenstreik und Schießbefehl. Generalstreik und Märzkämpfe in Berlin 1919. (Münster, 2012) 
 Richard Müller: Eine Geschichte der Novemberrevolution. (Berlin, 2011) 
 Karl Retzlaw: Spartacus. Erinnerungen eines Parteiarbeiters. 5th Edition (Neue Kritik, Frankfurt, 1985)
 Wolfram Wette: Gustav Noske. Eine politische Biographie. (Düsseldorf, 1987)
 Regina Knoll: Der Generalstreik und die Märzkämpfe in Berlin im Jahre 1919. In: Wissenschaftliche Zeitschrift der Karl-Marx-Universität Leipzig, 1957/58
 Klaus Gietinger: Der Konterrevolutionär. Waldemar Pabst – eine deutsche Karriere. (Hamburg, 2009) 
Pierre Broué: The German Revolution, 1917-1923. (Brill, Netherlands, 2005)

External links 

 Ralf Hoffrogge: The German Revolution’s Bloody End. In: Jacobin Magazine, March 2019
 Reinhard Sturm: Vom Kaiserreich zur Republik 1918/19. In: Bundeszentrale für Politische Bildung, 23 December 2011
 Gerd Nohr: März 1919. In: Marxistische Bibliothek, 10 May 2007, Archived from Original
Paul Levi: Brief an Lenin (27. März 1919). In: Marxists Internet Archive, 9 August 2008
 Alte Ansichtskarten – Berlin-Strassenkämpfe_01 – Historische Postkarten. In: heimatsammlung.de
 Arnulf Scriba: Die Märzkämpfe 1919. In: Deutsches Historisches Museum, 1 September 2014
 Simon Rees: The Bloodhounds of Berlin. In: firstworldwar.com, 22 August 2009

References 

Protests in Germany
Rebellions in Germany
General strikes in Europe
1919 in Germany
Conflicts in 1919
20th-century rebellions
German Revolution of 1918–1919
1919 labor disputes and strikes
Labor in Germany
20th century in Berlin
Political repression in Germany
Communism in Germany
1910s in Berlin